Conway Robinson State Forest is a state forest in Prince William County, Virginia, near Manassas National Battlefield Park. It serves as a wildflower and wildlife sanctuary.

History
The Conway Robinson State Forest was named after Conway Robinson, a 19th-century lawyer, historian, and author from the state of Virginia.  He is most famous for having argued approximately 100 cases before the Supreme Court of the United States and being a founding member of the Virginia Historical Society.  The Conway Robinson Park Memorial Association sought to perpetuate the memory of him as a distinguished Virginian through the development of a state forest, which was eventually established in February 1938.

Description
The Conway Robinson State Forest is owned and maintained by the Virginia Department of Forestry. Forest management activities include tree planting and harvesting, as well as actions to enhance water quality, aesthetics and wildlife. Management is guided by the original deed, which limits tree removal except for the improvement of the forest's resources and habitat. In addition, the forest provides space for research projects by college or university students, tours and demonstrations, and other educational activities.

Public use and access
The forest serves as a recreation area with various uses. The forest is open to the public for recreation activities during daylight hours. Camping and motorized vehicles are prohibited.

A State Forest Use Permit is required for visitors aged 16 or older to ride horses, ride mountain bikes, hunt, and trap. A State Forest Use Permit is not required for those using the forest for walking or hiking. A valid Virginia hunting license in addition to a State Forest Permit is required for hunting or trapping within the forest.

See also
 List of Virginia state forests

References

External links
Virginia Department of Forestry: Conway Robinson State Forest

Virginia state forests
Protected areas of Prince William County, Virginia
Protected areas established in 1938
1938 establishments in Virginia